Gedunin is a pentacyclic triterpenoid with the molecular formula C28H43O7. It is most notably found in Azadirachta indica, but is a constituent of several other plants. Gedunin shows therapeutic potential in the treatment of leukemia, and Parkinson's disease.

Natural occurrence 
Azadirachta indica is the most notable source of gedunin, but it has also been found in the following plants:

 Cedrela fissilis
 Cedrela odorata
 Cedrela salvadorensis
 Entandrophragma angolense
 Khaya grandifoliola
 Melia azedarach
 Toona sinensis
 Xylocarpus granatum

References 

Acetate esters
Antimalarial agents
Antineoplastic and immunomodulating drugs
Antineoplastic drugs
Enones
Epoxides
Furans
Lactones
Pentacyclic compounds
Triterpenes